This is a list of electoral results for the Division of Hoddle in Australian federal elections from the division's creation in 1949 until its abolition in 1955.

Members

Election results

Elections in the 1950s

1954

1951

Elections in the 1940s

1949

References

 Australian Electoral Commission. Federal election results
 Carr, Adam. Psephos

Australian federal electoral results by division